Márton Fucsovics (born 8 February 1992) is a Hungarian professional tennis player. He achieved a career-high ATP singles ranking of No. 31 on 4 March 2019. He is currently the No. 1 Hungarian player.

Early life
Fucsovics started to play tennis at the age of five. He came through the ranks quickly and at the age of 8 he played in a field 3–4 years older.

In 2003 Fucsovics won his age group National Championship and the Nike Junior Tour. With that he got the chance to represent Hungary on the World Final in Sun City, South Africa. Fucsovics also showed talent in basketball as a youth, but chose to make tennis his career path.

Junior tennis
Fucsovics's first major success came in 2009, when he won the US Open Boys' Doubles title, with Hsieh Cheng-peng of Chinese Taipei. In 2010 he reached the semi-final of the Australian Open Boys' Singles, and a few months later he won the Wimbledon Boys' Singles, defeating qualifier Benjamin Mitchell in a straight-sets final. Fucsovics did not lose a set throughout the entire tournament. He also participated in the doubles' event alongside Czech Libor Salaba, and reached the quarter-finals. Later that year he also reached the semi-final of the 2010 US Open – Boys' singles, in which he lost to Jack Sock.

Fucsovics was also an integral part of the Hungarian U-18 national tennis team.  The team won the prestigious Galea/Valerio Cup in Venice to claim Hungary's first ever boys' European Summer Cups title. The other members of the team were Máté Zsiga and Levente Gödry.

Fucsovics worked his way to No. 1 in the ITF Junior Rankings in July 2010 and as a result entered the Youth Olympics as tournament's top seed. He suffered a surprise loss, however, in the first round, to eventual quarterfinalist Oliver Golding.

Senior career

2009–2016: Early career and first Challenger titles 
In 2013 Fucsovics won two Challenger titles, the first in May at the Kunming Open and at the Andria Challenger in November.

In 2016 he qualified for his first Grand Slam at the US Open losing to Nicolás Almagro in three sets in the round of 128.

2017: Two Challenger titles and top 100 
In 2017 he won two challengers for the first time since 2013 in June, the first during the Internazionali di Tennis Città di Vicenza and the second at Ilkley Challenger. 

His success at Ilkley saw him win a wildcard into 2017 Wimbledon Championships main draw where he lost to the 16th seed Gilles Müller in the opening round. He also reached a career high ranking of 99, breaking into the top 100 for the first time.

In September 2017 he played a pivotal role in Hungary's promotion to the World Group winning 3 rubbers against favorites Russia.

2018: First Grand Slam fourth round, first ATP title, top 50 

Fucsovics started his 2018 season at the Tata Open Maharashtra in Pune, India. He lost in the second round to fourth seed Benoît Paire. Seeded sixth at the Canberra Challenger, he reached the final, but he ended up losing to seventh seed Andreas Seppi. Ranked 80 at the Australian Open, he won his first match in a Grand Slam main draw by defeating Radu Albot in the first round. In the second round, he upset 13th seed, Sam Querrey, in four sets. He ended up reaching the fourth round where he fell to world No. 2, five-time champion, and eventual champion, Roger Federer.

Representing Hungary in the Davis Cup tie against Belgium, Fucsovics lost both of his matches to Ruben Bemelmans and David Goffin. Hungary ended up losing the tie to Belgium 2-3. As the top seed at the Hungarian Challenger Open, he made it to the semifinals where he was defeated by Nicola Kuhn. In March, he competed at the Indian Wells Masters. He was eliminated in the second round by second seed and world No. 3, Marin Čilić. Seeded fourth at the Irving Classic, he reached the semifinals where he was beaten by Matteo Berrettini. In Miami, he lost in the first round to Maximilian Marterer.

Fucsovics started his clay-court season at the Grand Prix Hassan II. He lost in the first round to Malek Jaziri. At the Monte-Carlo Masters, he was defeated in the first round by Daniil Medvedev. Seeded sixth at the Hungarian Open, he was eliminated in the first round by German lucky loser Yannick Maden. At the BMW Open in Munich, he reached the quarterfinals where he lost to Maximilian Marterer. In Rome, he fell in the first round of qualifying to Italian wildcard Filippo Baldi. Fucsovics played one more tournament before Roland Garros. At the Geneva Open, he upset fifth seed, Albert Ramos Viñolas, in the first round. He then upset third seed and two-time defending champion, Stan Wawrinka, in the quarterfinals. In the semifinals, he beat sixth seed, Steve Johnson to reach his first ATP singles final. He won his first ATP singles title by defeating Peter Gojowczyk in the final. Due to him winning the title in Geneva, his ranking improved from 60 to 45. At the French Open, he won his first-round match over Vasek Pospisil. He lost in the second round to 16th seed and world No. 17, Kyle Edmund.

Fucsovics started his grass-court season at the MercedesCup in Stuttgart. He lost in the second round to seventh seed and eventual finalist, Milos Raonic. In Halle, he retired during his first-round match against Philipp Kohlschreiber.

2019: Second ATP final, Career-high ranking, top 40 debut

Fucsovics started his 2019 season at the Qatar ExxonMobil Open. He lost in the second round to world No. 1 and two-time champion, Novak Djokovic. Seeded seventh at the Sydney International, he was defeated in the second round by Australian John Millman. Ranked 38 at the Australian Open, he lost in the second round to 11th seed and world No. 12, Borna Ćorić.

In February, Fucsovics competed at the Sofia Open. He upset eighth seed, Andreas Seppi, in the first round. He ended up reaching his third ATP singles final where he lost to third seed and world No. 16, Daniil Medvedev. In Rotterdam, he beat ninth seed and world No. 20, Nikoloz Basilashvili, in the second round. He fell in his quarterfinal match to top seed and world No. 7, Kei Nishikori. At the Dubai Championships, he made it to the quarterfinals where he lost to second seed, world No. 7, seven-time champion, and eventual champion, Roger Federer. Seeded 29th at the Indian Wells Masters, he was eliminated in the second round by 2017 finalist Stan Wawrinka. Seeded 29th at the Miami Open, he was beaten in the second round by qualifier Félix Auger-Aliassime, who would end up reaching the semifinals.

Fucsovics started his clay-court season in April at the Monte-Carlo Masters. He defeated 12th seed and world No. 17, Nikoloz Basilashvili, in the first round. He lost in the second round to Cam Norrie. At the Barcelona Open, he was ousted from the tournament in the second round by fifth seed, world No. 8, and last year finalist, Stefanos Tsitsipas. Seeded eighth at the BMW Open, he reached the quarterfinals where he lost to third seed and world No. 19, Marco Cecchinato. In Madrid, he was defeated in the second round by 15th seed and world No. 18, Gaël Monfils. At the Italian Open, he lost in the first round to 14th seed Nikoloz Basilashvili. Seeded fourth and last year champion at the Geneva Open, he lost in the second round to Federico Delbonis. Due to not defending his title, his ranking fell from 38 to 50. At the French Open, he was defeated in the first round by 17th seed and world No. 20, Diego Schwartzman in five sets.

Fucsovics started his grass-court season at the MercedesCup. He beat fourth seed and world No. 17, Nikoloz Basilashvili, in the second round. He lost in the quarterfinals to sixth seed and world No. 18, Milos Raonic. At the Queen's Club Championships, he lost in the first round to 2017 champion and eventual champion, Feliciano López. Ranked 51 at Wimbledon, he lost in the second round to 12th seed and world No. 10, Fabio Fognini, in five sets.

At the Hamburg Open, Fucsovics was defeated in the second round by top seed and world No. 4, Dominic Thiem. Seeded fifth at the Generali Open Kitzbühel, he lost in the first round to eventual finalist Albert Ramos Viñolas.

Starting his US Open series at the Rogers Cup in Montreal, Fucsovics lost in round one to Cam Norrie. In Cincinnati, he was defeated in the first round of qualifying by Alexei Popyrin. Ranked 64 at the US Open, he was eliminated in the first round by 17th seed and world No. 18, Nikoloz Basilashvili.

After the US Open, Fucsovics played for Hungary in the Davis Cup tie against Ukraine. He won his first match over Illya Marchenko. However, he lost his second match to Sergiy Stakhovsky. Hungary still was able to defeat Ukraine 3-2. At the St. Petersburg Open, he retired during his second-round match against fourth seed, world No. 15, and eventual finalist, Borna Ćorić, due to hip problems. In Chengdu, he lost in the first round to lucky loser Lloyd Harris. Getting past qualifying at the Erste Bank Open, he retired during his second-round match against second seed and world No. 9, Karen Khachanov. Fucsovics played his final tournament of the season at the Slovak Open. Seeded second, he lost in the second round to Ilya Ivashka.

Fucsovics ended the year ranked No. 70.

2020: Success at Grand Slams: Two fourth rounds & one third round
Fucsovics started his 2020 season at the Qatar ExxonMobil Open. Getting past qualifying, he beat eighth seed, Frances Tiafoe, in the first round. He lost in the quarterfinals to Miomir Kecmanović. As the top seed at the first edition of the Bendigo Challenger, he retired during his second-round match against Andrea Vavassori due to an ankle injury. Ranked 67 at the Australian Open, he upset 13th seed, Denis Shapovalov, in the first round. He ended up reaching the fourth round where he was defeated by third seed, former world No. 1, and six-time champion, Roger Federer, in four sets.

Making it past qualifying at the Rotterdam Open, Fucsovics was eliminated in the first round by sixth seed and world No. 12, Roberto Bautista Agut. In Marseille, he lost in the first round to Alexander Bublik. At the Dubai Championships, he was beaten in the first round by third seed and world No. 9, Gaël Monfils. Representing Hungary in the Davis Cup tie against Belgium, he wom both of his matches beating Kimmer Coppejans and Ruben Bemelmans. In the end, Hungary won the tie over Belgium 3-2. The ATP tour canceled all tournaments from March 12 through July due to the Coronavirus pandemic.

When the ATP tour resumed tournament play in August, Fucsovics competed at the Western & Southern Open. This event usually takes place in Cincinnati but this year, it was held at the USTA Billie Jean King National Tennis Center in New York City in order to reduce unnecessary player travel by centralizing the tournament and the subsequent US Open in the same venue. Making it through qualifying, he beat 14th seed and world No. 19, Grigor Dimitrov, in the second round in three sets. He lost in the third round to Filip Krajinović. Ranked 66 at the US Open, he upset 14th seed, world No. 20, and last year semifinalist, Grigor Dimitrov, in the second round. He fell in the third round to American Frances Tiafoe.

Ranked 63 at the French Open, Fucsovics stunned fourth seed and world No. 5, Daniil Medvedev, in the first round to earn his first career top-10 victory. He ended up making it to the fourth round where he lost to 13th seed and world No. 12, Andrey Rublev.

After Roland Garros, Fucsovics played at the Bett1Hulks Indoors. Here, he was defeated in the first round by Gilles Simon. Getting past qualifying at the Paris Masters, he was ousted from the tournament in the first round by 15th seed, world No. 24, and 2018 finalist, Borna Ćorić. His final tournament of the season was at the Sofia Open. Last year finalist at this event, he lost in the first round to eventual champion Jannik Sinner.

Fucsovics ended the year ranked No. 55.

2021: First Major quarterfinal & ATP 500 final, back to top 40
Fucsovics began his 2021 season at the first edition of the Murray River Open. Seeded 16th, he lost in the second round to Egor Gerasimov in three sets. Ranked 55 at the Australian Open, he pulled off a second-round stunner by beating 17th seed, world No. 18, and 2014 champion, Stan Wawrinka. He saved three match points to complete the upset. He was defeated in the third round by 14th seed Milos Raonic.

In March, Fucsovics played at the Rotterdam Open. Getting past qualifying, he reached the biggest final of his career; he ended up losing in the championship match to fourth seed and world No. 8, Andrey Rublev. Despite losing in the final, he returned to the top 50 in the rankings. At the Qatar ExxonMobil Open, he was forced to withdraw from his quarterfinal match against third seed and defending champion, Andrey Rublev, due to a lower back injury. In Dubai, he ousted sixth seed and world No. 15, Pablo Carreño Busta, in the second round. He then beat 11th seed and world No. 26, Dušan Lajović, in the third round. He fell in the quarterfinals to second seed Andrey Rublev. Seeded 29th at the Miami Open, he lost in the third round to fourth seed Andrey Rublev.

Fucsovics started his clay-court season at the Monte-Carlo Masters. He was eliminated in the first round by Lorenzo Sonego. In Madrid, he lost in the first round to Alexander Bublik. At the Italian Open, he was defeated in the second round by fourth seed Dominic Thiem. Fucsovics played one more tournament before the French Open which was the Geneva Open. He was ousted from the tournament in the second round by Swiss wildcard Dominic Stricker. Ranked 44 at Roland Garros, he was beaten in the second round by 27th seed and world No. 29, Fabio Fognini.

After the French Open, Fucsovics turned his attention to the grass-court season. At the Stuttgart Open, he lost in the first round to sixth seed and world No. 32, Ugo Humbert. In Eastbourne, he was defeated in the second round by lucky loser Kwon Soon-woo. Ranked 48 at Wimbledon, he upset 19th seed and world No. 23, Jannik Sinner, in the first round. In the third round, he upset ninth seed and world No. 11, Diego Schwartzman. In the fourth round, he stunned fifth seed and world No. 7, Andrey Rublev, to reach the quarterfinals for the first time in his career. He became the first Hungarian man to reach the Wimbledon quarterfinals since József Asbóth in 1948 and the first Hungarian man in a Grand Slam quarterfinal since Balázs Taróczy at the 1981 French Open. He lost in the quarterfinals to world No. 1, five-time champion, and eventual champion, Novak Djokovic. With this successful run, he returned to the top 40 in rankings at world No. 39 on 13 July 2021.

In August, Fucsovics competed at the Western & Southern Open in Cincinnati. He was defeated in the first round by 12th seed and world No. 17, Félix Auger-Aliassime. Seeded fourth at the Winston-Salem Open, he lost in the third round to 15th seed and rising star, Carlos Alcaraz, in three sets. Ranked 41 at the US Open, he fell in the first round to Andreas Seppi, despite having five match points in the fifth-set tie-breaker.

At the Moselle Open, Fucsovics lost in the first round to fifth seed and world No. 24, Lorenzo Sonego. At the first edition of the San Diego Open, he was eliminated in the first round by Grigor Dimitrov. In Indian Wells, he lost in the first round to Gianluca Mager. At the European Open in Antwerp, he beat fourth seed and world No. 20, Roberto Bautista Agut, in the second round. In the quarterfinals, he was defeated by seventh seed and world No. 32, Lloyd Harris. At the Vienna Open, he was ousted from the tournament in the first round by Cam Norrie. At the Paris Masters, he pushed world No. 1, five-time champion, and eventual champion, Novak Djokovic, to three sets, but he ended up losing the match. Seeded seventh at the Stockholm Open, he lost in the second round to Botic van de Zandschulp. In his final tournament of the season, he represented Hungary in the Davis Cup tie against Australia. He played one match and lost to Alex de Minaur in a three-set thriller.

Fucsovics ended the year ranked No. 40.

2022: Sixth top 100 year-end finish in a row
Fucsovics started his 2022 season at the Adelaide International 1. Seeded fifth, he lost in the first round to qualifier Egor Gerasimov. Seeded eighth at the Adelaide International 2, he was defeated in the second round by qualifier Corentin Moutet. Ranked 35 at the Australian Open, he fell in the first round to Dušan Lajović in five sets.

As a previous year finalist at the Rotterdam Open, Fucsovics reached the quarterfinals where he was ousted by second seed and defending champion, Andrey Rublev, in a rematch from last year's championship match. In Doha, he upset eighth seed, Lloyd Harris, in the first round. He ended up losing in the quarterfinals to third seed, world No. 22, defending champion, and eventual finalist, Nikoloz Basilashvili. At the Dubai Championships, he was eliminated in the first round by sixth seed and world No. 14, Denis Shapovalov. Playing for Hungary in the Davis Cup tie against Australia, he defeated Thanasi Kokkinakis in his first match. In the second match, he lost to Alex de Minaur. In the end, Australia got the win over Hungary 3-2. After Davis Cup, he competed at the Indian Wells Masters. He lost in the first round to American Mackenzie McDonald. In Miami, he was defeated in the second round by 14th seed, rising star, and eventual champion, Carlos Alcaraz.

Starting his clay-court season at the Monte-Carlo Masters, Fucsovics lost in the second round to 12th seed and world No. 16, Diego Schwartzman. In Barcelona, he beat 15th seed, Federico Delbonis, in the second round. He was beaten in the third round by fourth seed and world No. 10, Cam Norrie. At the Madrid Open, he reached the final round of qualifying and lost to Maxime Cressy. Fucsovics retired during his final round of qualifying match against Dušan Lajović at the Italian Open. At the French Open, he was beaten in the second round by 20th seed and world No. 23, Marin Čilić, who would end up reaching the semifinals.

Fucsovics started his grass court season at the BOSS Open in Stuttgart. He upset third seed and world No. 13, Hubert Hurkacz, in the second round. He retired during his quarterfinal match against Nick Kyrgios due to a lower back injury. At the Halle Open, he retired during his first-round match against seventh seed Roberto Bautista Agut. Ranked 59 and last year quarterfinalist at Wimbledon, he lost in the first round to Alexander Bublik. After Wimbledon, in which he lost in the first round, his ranking fell from No. 59 to No. 97 as he was unable to defend his quarterfinal points due to the “no points awarded to all players” ATP policy related to the Russians players ban.

Fucsovics played one warm up tournament in the lead up to the US Open. At the Winston-Salem Open, he lost in the final round of qualifying to Jason Kubler. However, due to the withdrawal of Sebastián Báez, he got entry as a lucky loser into the main draw. He lost in the first round to Tseng Chun-hsin. Ranked No. 98 at the US Open, he won his first round match when his opponent, 30th seed and world No. 32, American Maxime Cressy retired injured. He was defeated in the second round by Alejandro Davidovich Fokina in a five sets match which included a fifth set super tiebreaker.

After the US Open, Fucsovics represented Hungary in the Davis Cup World Group I tie against Ukraine. He won both of his matches by beating Viacheslav Bielinskyi and Illya Beloborodko. Hungary won the tie over Ukraine 3-1 to move on to the Qualifying round. At the Moselle Open, he lost in the final round of qualifying to Grégoire Barrère.

He finished the year ranked No. 98 on 21 November and the season ranked No. 87 on 28 November 2022 after winning the 2022 Slovak Open and reaching the semifinals of the 2022 Internazionali di Tennis Castel del Monte in his last two tournaments of the season.

2023: Major third round, First Masters fourth round at Indian Wells

Fucsovics started the season strong winning his sixth Challenger title at the 2023 Canberra Tennis International where he defeated in the final Swiss Leandro Riedi, who came from a 15-match unbeaten streak. At the Australian Open, after beating Federico Coria and Lloyd Harris, the Hungarian reached the third round where he was defeated by world No. 16 Jannik Sinner in five sets despite winning the first two of them. At the 2023 BNP Paribas Open he reached the fourth round defeating JJ Wolf, 16th seed Alex de Minaur in a less then 90 minutes match, and Alex Molcan. As a result he moved back into the top 75 in the rankings.

Performance timelines

Singles 
Current through the 2023 BNP Paribas Open.

ATP career finals

Singles: 3 (1 title, 2 runners-up)

Future and Challenger finals

Singles: 14 (6–8)

Doubles 4 (3–1)

Best Grand Slam results details

Record against top 10 players

Fucsovics's record against those who have been ranked in the top 10, with active players in boldface.

Wins over top 10 players 
He has a  record against players who were, at the time the match was played, ranked in the top 10.

Davis Cup

Participations: (32–20)

   indicates the outcome of the Davis Cup match followed by the score, date, place of event, the zonal classification and its phase, and the court surface.

References

 Márton Fucsovics' Career (Hungarian)
 2010 Galea/Valerio Cup – 18 & Under Boys

External links
Official homepage of Márton Fucsovics
 
 
 

1992 births
Living people
Hungarian male tennis players
People from Nyíregyháza
Tennis players at the 2010 Summer Youth Olympics
US Open (tennis) junior champions
Wimbledon junior champions
Grand Slam (tennis) champions in boys' singles
Grand Slam (tennis) champions in boys' doubles
Sportspeople from Szabolcs-Szatmár-Bereg County
20th-century Hungarian people
21st-century Hungarian people